Cyrano de Bergerac is a 1946 French romantic comedy film directed by Fernand Rivers and starring Claude Dauphin, Ellen Bernsen and Pierre Bertin. It is based on the 1897 play Cyrano de Bergerac by Edmond Rostand.

The film's sets were designed by the art director René Renoux.

Plot summary

Cast
 Claude Dauphin as Cyrano de Bergerac
 Ellen Bernsen as Roxane
 Pierre Bertin as Le comte de Guiche
 Christian Bertola as Christian de Neuvillette,
 Michel Nastorg as Le Bret
 Gaston Rullier as Carbon de Castel-Jaloux
 René Sarvil as Ragueneau
 Alice Tissot as la duègne
 Desportes as Montfleury
 Max Roger as le vicomte de Valvert
 Henri Vernet
 Paul Faivre
 Jeanne Hardeyn
 Christiane Sertilange
 Jean-Marc Tennberg
 Christian Alers
 Robert Balpo
 Madeleine Brosy

Bibliography
 Oscherwitz, Dayna & Higgins, MaryEllen. The A to Z of French Cinema. Scarecrow Press, 2009.
 Oscherwitz, Dayna. Past Forward: French Cinema and the Post-Colonial Heritage. SIU Press, 2010.

References

External links
 
 

1946 films
French romantic comedy films
1940s French-language films
Films based on Cyrano de Bergerac (play)
Films directed by Fernand Rivers
French black-and-white films
1946 romantic comedy films
1940s French films